Cusack is a surname. Notable people with the surname include:

 Alex Cusack, Australian-born Irish cricketer.
 Ann Cusack, American actress, daughter of Dick Cusack
 Billy Cusack (born 1966), Scottish judoka
 Michael Cusack (born 1968), English Doctor
 Carmen Cusack, American musical theater actress and singer
 Catherine Cusack, Irish actress, daughter of Cyril Cusack
 Catherine Cusack (politician), Australian politician
 Cyril Cusack, Irish actor
 Dick Cusack, American actor and filmmaker
 Donal Óg Cusack, Irish hurler
 Dymphna Cusack, Australian writer
 Henry Edward Cusack, Irish locomotive Engineer
 Joan Cusack, American actress, daughter of Dick Cusack
 John Cusack, American actor and writer, son of Dick Cusack
 John Cusack (Australian politician) 
 Joyce Cusack, American politician
 Loretta Cusack (born 1963), British judoka
 Maggie Cusack, academic and head of Irish university
 Mary Frances Cusack, Irish nun and writer
 Michael Cusack (animator)
 Michael Cusack, Irish teacher and founder of the Gaelic Athletic Association
 Niamh Cusack, Irish actress, daughter of Cyril Cusack
 Robert Cusack, Australian swimmer
 Sinéad Cusack, Irish actress, daughter of Cyril Cusack
 Sorcha Cusack, Irish actress, daughter of Cyril Cusack
 Thomas Cusack (disambiguation)

See also
 Cusack Park (disambiguation)
 Cusick

Cusack